Standesamt Wongrowitz was a civil registration district (Standesamt) located in Kreis Wongrowitz, province of Posen of the German Empire (1871–1918). This Standesamt was located in and administered the town of Wongrowitz as well as the nearby communities of:

See also
 Wągrowiec (general article about the town where the Standesamt was located)

External links 
  Municipal site

German Empire
Kingdom of Prussia